The Carmen Saeculare (Latin for "Secular Hymn" or "Song of the Ages") is a hymn in Sapphic meter written by the Roman poet Horace. It was commissioned by the Roman emperor Augustus in 17 BC. The hymn was sung by a chorus of twenty-seven maidens and the same number of youths, all dressed in white, on the occasion of the Ludi Saeculares (Secular Games), which celebrated the end of one  saeculum (typically 110 years in length) and the beginning of another.  The mythological and religious song is in the form of a prayer addressed to Apollo and Diana; it especially brings to prominence Apollo, functioning as a surrogate for and patron of the princeps (Augustus), for whom a new temple on the Palatine had recently been consecrated.  A marble inscription recording the ceremony and the part played by Horace still survives.

The Carmen Saeculare is the earliest fully preserved lyric poem for which there is definite information about the circumstances of its public performance.

See also
 Occasional poetry
Secular hymn (genre)

References

External links

The text of the Carmen Saeculare in Latin
English translation of the Carmen Saeculare
Latin Text of Carmen Saeculare at the Latin Library 
Commentary on Latin text by Paul Shorey
 
 Carmina Horatiana The Carmen Saeculare recited in Latin by Thomas Bervoets.

17 BC
1st-century BC Latin books
Ancient Roman culture
Poetry by Horace
Occasional poetry
Apollo
Diana (mythology)
Hymns
Augustus